Markscheider Kunst (Маркшейдер Кунст) is a ska band from St.Petersburg, Russia. It plays afro-rock, soukous, ska and reggae. Russian musical influences can be heard in their music as well. The band was founded in 1992 by geology students from St. Petersburg. The band has done gigs in many countries, as well as being the opening band for Manu Chao in Moscow in 2002.

Members

Current members 
Sergei Yefremenko (EFR) (1992–present) – guitar, vocals, lyrics   
Kirill Oskin (1992–present) – bass, backing vocals   
 Vladimir Matushkin (Nguba) (1995–present) – guitar, backing vocals
Kirill Ipatov (1995–present) – timbales, conga
Denis Rachkov (2000–present) – guitar
Danila Prokopev (2007–present)  – drums, timbales
Yegor Popov (2017–present)  – trumpet
Anton Boyarskikh (2017–present) – trombone
Ilya Vymenits (1997–present) – timbales, conga, bongos

Former members 
 Sergey Yegorov (Snegoriy) (1992–2007) – drums, backing vocals
Serafim Makangila (1996–2003) – vocals
Mitya Khramtsov (1996–1998) – 
Vadim Yagman (1999–2002) – trumpet
Aleksey Kanev (1999–2002) – saxophone
 Ramil Shamsutdinov (1999–2004) – trombone
Mikhail Nikolayev (2001–2005) – timbales, conga
 Alexander Plyusnin (2003–2017) – trumpet
 Ivan Neklyudov (2004–2017) – saxophone
Anton Vishnyakov (2005–2017) – trombone
Pavel Vasilyev (2017–2018) – keyboards

Discography 
Kem Byt? (1994/1996)
Live in Helsinki (single) (1997)
St.Petersburg-Kinshasa Transit (1998)
Krasivo Sleva (2001)
Na Svyazi (2003)
Ryba (maxisingle) (2006)
Café Babalu (2008)
 Utopia (2010)
 FREEDOM (2020)

External links 

Musical groups from Saint Petersburg
World fusion groups
Russian reggae musicians
Russian rock music groups
Third-wave ska groups
Musical groups established in 1992